Edward Trowbridge Collins Sr. (May 2, 1887 – March 25, 1951), nicknamed "Cocky", was an American professional baseball player, manager and executive. A graduate of Columbia University, Collins holds major league career records in several categories and is among the top few players in several other categories. In 1925, Collins became just the sixth person to join the 3,000 hit club – and the last for the next 17 seasons. His 47 career home runs are the fewest of anyone in it. Collins is the only non-Yankee to win five or more World Series titles with the same club as a player.

Collins coached and managed in the major leagues after retiring as a player. He also served as general manager of the Boston Red Sox. He was inducted into the Baseball Hall of Fame in 1939.

Early life
Born in Millerton, a 384-acre village in Dutchess County, New York, Collins was unique in his time in that he was focused on both his athletic skills and his education and intelligence. He graduated from Columbia University (where he was a member of Beta Theta Pi fraternity) at a time when few major league players had attended college.

He started his professional baseball career on September 17, 1906, when he signed with the Philadelphia Athletics organization at the age of 19. At the time of his signing, Collins was still a student at Columbia, and he played some of his early minor league games under the last name of Sullivan so that he could protect his collegiate status. Collins had lost his collegiate eligibility when it was discovered he played with Plattsburgh and Rutland in the 1906 Northern Independent League. He then signed with the Athletics and made his debut.

Major league career

Philadelphia Athletics

After spending all but 14 games of the 1907 season in the minor leagues, he played in 102 games in 1908 and by 1909 was a full-time player. That season, he registered a .347 batting average and 67 steals. He would also be named the A's starting second baseman in 1909, a position he would play for the rest of his career, after seeing time at second, third, shortstop, and the outfield the previous two seasons. In 1910, Collins stole a career-high 81 bases, the first American League player to steal 80+ bases in a season, and played on the first of his six World Series championship teams.

Collins was renowned for his intelligence, confidence, batting prowess and speed. He is one of only five players to steal six bases in a game, and the only person to do so twice, with both occurrences happening within eleven days, on September 11 and September 22, 1912, respectively. He was part of the Athletics' "$100,000 infield" (and the highest-paid of the quartet) which propelled the team to four American League (AL) pennants and three World Series titles between 1910 and 1914.

In 1914, the newly formed Federal League disrupted major league contract stability by luring away established stars from the AL and NL with inflated salaries. To retain Collins, Athletics manager Connie Mack offered his second baseman the longest guaranteed contract (five years) that had ever been offered to a player. Collins declined, and after the 1914 season Mack sold Collins to the White Sox for $50,000, the highest price ever paid for a player up to that point and the first of only three times that a reigning MVP was sold or traded (the others being Alex Rodriguez in 2003 and Giancarlo Stanton in 2017, both to the New York Yankees). The Sox paid Collins $15,000 for 1915, making him the third highest paid player in the league, behind Ty Cobb and Tris Speaker.

Chicago White Sox

In Chicago, Collins continued to post top-ten batting and stolen base numbers, and he helped the Sox capture pennants in 1917 and 1919. He was part of the notorious "Black Sox" team that threw the 1919 World Series to the Cincinnati Reds. However Collins was not accused of being part of the conspiracy and was considered to have played honestly, his low .226 batting average notwithstanding.

In August , he was named player-manager of the White Sox and held the position through the  season, posting a record of 174–160 (.521). HIs two full seasons were the only winning seasons enjoyed by the White Sox from 1921 to 1936.

On June 3, 1925, he collected the 3,000th hit of his career to become the sixth player in major league history to join the 3,000 hit club, doing so for the White Sox off pitcher Rip Collins of the Detroit Tigers at Navin Field on a single. Incidentally, this was also the first game in which there were two members of the 3,000 hit club playing in the same game, as Ty Cobb played center field.

Return to the Athletics
For all intents and purposes, however, his playing career was over; he recorded only 143 games in his last four years, mostly as a pinch hitter. The A's won the World Series in 1929 and 1930, but Collins didn't play in either Series. His last appearance as a player was on August 2, 1930.

Collins finished his career with 1,300 runs batted in. To date, Collins is the only MLB player to play for two teams for at least 12 seasons each. Upon his retirement, he ranked second in major league history in career games (2,826), walks (1,499) and stolen bases (744), third in runs scored (1,821), fourth in hits (3,315) and at bats (9,949), sixth in on-base percentage (.424), and eighth in total bases (4,268); he was also fourth in AL history in triples (187).

He still holds the major league record of 512 career sacrifice bunts, over 100 more than any other player. He was the first major leaguer in modern history to steal 80 bases in a season, and still shares the major league record of six steals in a game, which he accomplished twice in September 1912. He regularly batted over .320, retiring with a career average of .333. He also holds major league records for career games (2,650), assists (7,630) and total chances (14,591) at second base, and ranks second in putouts (6,526). Collins is one of only 31 players in baseball history to have appeared in major league games in four decades.

Front-office career
Following the A's 1930 World Series victory, Collins retired as a player and immediately stepped into a full-time position as a coach with the A's. After two seasons as a coach, Collins was hired as vice president and general manager of the Boston Red Sox. The new owner, Tom Yawkey, was a close friend and had bought the Red Sox at Collins' suggestion. He assumed management of a team that had bottomed out from a long decline dating from their sale of Babe Ruth; the 1932 Red Sox finished 43–111, the worst record in franchise history.

Collins remained GM through the 1947 season, retiring at age 60 after a period of declining health, thus ending 41 years in baseball.  During his 15 years as general manager, Collins helped turn a dreadful team into a contender once again. After two years rebuilding the awful team he had inherited, Collins managed winning seasons in seven of his final twelve years as general manager. His 1946 team won the Red Sox' first pennant since 1918. In May 2018, shortly after the City of Boston reverted the name of Yawkey Way to its original name of Jersey Street at the Red Sox' request, the Red Sox removed plaques honoring Yawkey and Collins from outside Fenway Park, reportedly due to Collins' refusal to sign black players. Present owner John Henry had made considerable efforts to separate the team from its perceived racist past. Collins' plaque had been in place since 1951.

Collins was inducted into the Baseball Hall of Fame in 1939. 

He struggled with major heart problems for several years at the end of his life. He was admitted to a hospital in Boston on March 10, 1951, and died there due to the heart condition on March 25 at age 63.

Managerial record

Legacy
In 1999, he was ranked number 24 on The Sporting News' list of the 100 Greatest Baseball Players, and was a nominee for the Major League Baseball All-Century Team. He played on a total of six World Series-winning teams (1910, 1911, 1913, 1917, 1929, and 1930), though he did not participate in any of the final two series' games.

Under the win shares statistical rating system created by baseball historian and analyst Bill James, Collins was the greatest second baseman of all time.

His son, Eddie Jr., was an outfielder who played for Yale University. He briefly saw major league action (in 1939 and 1941–42, all with the A's) and later worked in the Philadelphia Phillies' front office.

See also

 List of Major League Baseball career hits leaders
 Boston Red Sox Hall of Fame
 List of Major League Baseball career doubles leaders
 List of Major League Baseball career triples leaders
 List of Major League Baseball career runs scored leaders
 List of Major League Baseball career runs batted in leaders
 3,000 hit club
 List of Major League Baseball stolen base records
 List of Major League Baseball career stolen bases leaders
 List of Major League Baseball annual runs scored leaders
 List of Major League Baseball annual stolen base leaders
 List of Major League Baseball players who played in four decades
 List of Major League Baseball player-managers
 Major League Baseball titles leaders

References

External links

Official site
Eddie Collins - Baseballbiography.com

1887 births
1951 deaths
American League stolen base champions
Baseball players from New York (state)
Boston Red Sox executives
Chicago White Sox players
Chicago White Sox managers
Columbia Lions baseball players
Columbia College (New York) alumni
Major League Baseball executives
Major League Baseball general managers
Major League Baseball player-managers
Major League Baseball second basemen
National Baseball Hall of Fame inductees
Newark Sailors players
People from Millerton, New York
Philadelphia Athletics coaches
Philadelphia Athletics players
Plattsburgh (baseball) players